Agnė Bilotaitė (born 29 January 1982) is a Lithuanian politician from the Homeland Union – Lithuanian Christian Democrats group and has been member of the Seimas since 2008.

On 7 December 2020, she was approved to be the Minister of the Interior in the Šimonytė Cabinet.

Early life
Agnė Bilotaitė was born on 29 January 1982 in Klaipėda. She received her Bachelor of Political Sciences from Klaipėda University and Master of Law from Mykolas Romeris University.

Career
In 2006, Bilotaitė became the manager of Homeland Union's Western Division and was elected to the Tenth Seimas of Lithuania in 2008. She was member of the Nuclear Energy Commission and deputy chief of the Anti-Corruption Commission of the parliament. During her second term in the Eleventh Seimas, she served on the Committees on Environment Protection and State Administration and Local Authorities.

After winning the 2016 Lithuanian parliamentary election, Bilotaitė began her third term in Seimas. She is the deputy chair of Homeland Union - Lithuanian Christian Democrat Political Group in the parliament and a member of Committee on Audit and Anti-Corruption Commission.

Personal life
Bilotaitė is married to Gintas Petrus. She gave birth to their son in July 2017.

References

1982 births
Living people
Homeland Union politicians
People from Klaipėda
Members of the Seimas
21st-century Lithuanian women politicians
21st-century Lithuanian politicians
Ministers of Internal Affairs of Lithuania
Female interior ministers
Women government ministers of Lithuania
Klaipėda University alumni
Mykolas Romeris University alumni
Women members of the Seimas